Ricardo Katza (born 12 March 1978 in Cape Town, Western Cape) is a retired South African football (soccer) defender.

Katza made 19 appearances for the South Africa national football team.

References

External links 
 

1978 births
South African soccer players
South Africa international soccer players
Living people
Sportspeople from Cape Town
SuperSport United F.C. players
Association football defenders
Hellenic F.C. players
Cape Coloureds
2005 CONCACAF Gold Cup players
2006 Africa Cup of Nations players